Svarants is a village in the Tatev Municipality of the Syunik Province in Armenia.

Demographics

Population 
The National Statistical Service of the Republic of Armenia (ARMSTAT) reported its population was 270 in 2010, down from 360 at the 2001 census.

References 

Populated places in Syunik Province